James John Hogan (October 17, 1911 – June 14, 2005) was an American prelate of the Roman Catholic Church who served as the sixth bishop of the Diocese of Altoona-Johnstown in Pennsylvania (1966–1986).  He previously served as an auxiliary bishop of the Diocese of Trenton in New Jersey (1959–1966).

Biography

Early life 
Hogan was born in Philadelphia, Pennsylvania, and moved with his family to Camden, New Jersey, at a young age. After graduating from Camden Catholic High School in Cherry Hill, New Jersey, he studied at St. Charles College in Catonsville, Maryland.  Hogan then entered St. Mary's Seminary in Baltimore and afterwards the Pontifical North American College in Rome. 

While in Rome, Hogan was ordained to the priesthood by Bishop Ralph Leo Hayes on December 8, 1937.

Auxiliary Bishop of Trenton 
On November 27, 1959, Hogan was appointed as an auxiliary bishop of the Diocese of Trenton and Titular Bishop of Philomelium by Pope John XXIII. He received his episcopal consecration on February 25, 1960, from Bishop George W. Ahr, with Bishops James A. McNulty and James Griffiths serving as co-consecrators.

Bishop of Altoona-Johnstown 
Hogan was named bishop of the Diocese of Altoona-Johnstown by Pope Paul VI on May 23, 1966; he was installed on July 6, 1966.

Retirement and legacy 
On October 17, 1986, Pope John Paul II accepted Hogan's resignation as bishop of Altoona-Johnstown.

In 1994, Hogan was found liable for the actions of a Catholic pedophile priest, Francis Luddy. The jury found that the diocese and Hogan "knew that (Luddy) had a propensity for pedophilic behavior."  Evidence and testimony are amply demonstrated. The diocese and Hogan were "negligent in retaining him (Luddy) and his activities." The diocese paid $1.2 million in damages initially, and an additional $1 million award is pending.

James Hogan died on June 14, 2005, at Garvey Manor Nursing Home in Hollidaysburg, Pennsylvania, at age 93.

On March 1, 2016, Pennsylvania Attorney General Kathleen Kane announced that as bishop, Hogan was at the forefront of a major cover-up scandal involving the sexual assault of hundreds of children by diocese priests.

References

1911 births
2005 deaths
Camden Catholic High School alumni
St. Charles College alumni
St. Mary's Seminary and University alumni
Clergy from Philadelphia
Participants in the Second Vatican Council
People from Camden, New Jersey
Catholics from New Jersey
20th-century Roman Catholic bishops in the United States